Adam Whitney Savage (born July 15, 1967) is an American special effects designer and fabricator, actor, educator, and television personality and producer, best known as the former co-host (with Jamie Hyneman) of the Discovery Channel television series MythBusters and Unchained Reaction. His model work has appeared in major films, including Star Wars: Episode II – Attack of the Clones and The Matrix Reloaded. He is the host of the TV program Savage Builds, which premiered on the Science Channel on June 14, 2019. He is most active on the platform Adam Savage's Tested which includes a website and a YouTube channel.

Early life
Savage was born in New York City and was raised in North Tarrytown, New York, which was renamed Sleepy Hollow in 1996. He graduated from Sleepy Hollow High School in 1985. His maternal grandfather Cushman Haagensen was a surgeon who pioneered breast cancer surgery. His father Whitney Lee Savage (1928–1998) was a painter, filmmaker, and animator known for his work on Sesame Street, and he has work in the permanent collection of the Clay Center in Charleston, West Virginia. Whitney Lee was also known for directing the 1969 underground short film Mickey Mouse in Vietnam. His mother Karen was a psychotherapist. Savage was the second youngest of six children, with the four older children coming from his parents' previous marriages. He has two older brothers, two older sisters, and one younger sister. His sister Kate Savage is also an artist.

Savage began acting as a child and had five years of acting school. His early credits include voicing animated characters that his father produced for Sesame Street, Mr. Whipple's stock boy Jimmy in a Charmin commercial, and a drowning young man saved by a lifeguard in the 1985 Billy Joel music video "You're Only Human (Second Wind)".

Savage abandoned acting by the time he was 19. "I had passed on that in favor of doing stuff with my hands", he said. He describes MythBusters as "the perfect marriage of two things, performance and special effects."  As a teenager in Sleepy Hollow, Savage routinely visited the local bike shop to have flat tires fixed. The shop showed him how to do the repairs himself. From this experience, Savage said, "I realized you could take a bike apart and put it back together and it wasn't that hard… I've been building and putting bicycles together since then."

Savage broke his neck on his eighteenth birthday in a swimming accident, an injury he survived without suffering long-term consequences.

Career

Savage has worked as an animator, graphic designer, carpenter, projectionist, film developer, television presenter, set designer, toy designer, and gallery owner. He worked as a model maker on the films Galaxy Quest, Bicentennial Man, Star Wars: Episode II – Attack of the Clones, The Mummy, The Matrix Reloaded, and Space Cowboys, among others. Savage played the role of a helpful engineer in the 2001 film Ever Since the World Ended and the role of an army surplus store owner who sells a man a rocket engine for his pickup truck in 2006 in The Darwin Awards, which also featured MythBusters co-star Jamie Hyneman. He made a cameo appearance with Hyneman on CSI: Crime Scene Investigation on the May 1, 2008, episode "The Theory of Everything." In the "making of" material for The Matrix Revolutions, he appears in his role as a special effects artist and discusses some of the miniature effects used and the difficulties involved. He previously taught advanced model making in the department of industrial design at the Academy of Art University in San Francisco.

Savage has become a regular presenter at magician James Randi's annual skeptics conference, The Amaz!ng Meeting, since first appearing in January 2006. Savage credits his introduction to the skeptical community to Michael Shermer, who interviewed him for Skeptic Magazine. He also appeared in the United Kingdom, giving a talk at the first Amaz!ng Meeting London from October 3 to 4, 2009, hosted at the Mermaid Conference Centre, Blackfriars. Savage was a featured performer at the three w00tstock v1.x shows in 2009 and appeared in four w00tstock v2.x shows in 2010. He also appeared as a guest on Diggnation 220th show. Savage has also been a regular guest speaker at the annual Maker Faire since 2008, speaking on different topics such as his obsession with the dodo bird and problem-solving, and also taking questions from the audience members about MythBusters, among other topics. Savage hosted an episode of the Discovery Channel series Curiosity, in which he speculated as to whether or not it is possible for humans to live forever. During the program various topics such as limb regeneration, organ printers, and even age reversal are discussed. In 2011, Savage appeared as "Dan" in a short film directed by Frank Ippolito titled Night of the Little Dead. On November 25, 2011, he received an honorary doctorate from the University of Twente (Enschede, Netherlands) for popularizing science and technology.

Savage and Hyneman were judges on the game show Unchained Reaction which premiered in March 2012. Savage is an occasional guest host for lecture events at the San Francisco-based non-profit City Arts & Lectures, and delivered a keynote address at South by Southwest conference on March 10, 2014. On March 24, 2012 Savage appeared as a featured speaker at the first Reason Rally in Washington D.C. On May 18, 2012, Savage was the commencement speaker at Sarah Lawrence College. Savage is a co-host on the weekly podcast Still Untitled: The Adam Savage Project. The project launched on June 5, 2012, and is in the format of a conversation between Savage, tested.com editors-in-chief Will Smith and Norman Chan, and Simone Giertz about topics from science and movies to DIY and work ethic. Episodes typically last 3045 minutes. Savage is a co-owner, editor and contributor at tested.com.

In 2017, Savage toured with Michael Stevens on the Brain Candy LIVE! tour. In April 2017, Savage played the role of a mission specialist in episode Caliban's War of the series The Expanse. In June 2017, Savage was named "Humanist of the Year" by the American Humanist Association at their annual conference. October 2017, Savage played a cameo as a merchant selling blood bags in the Blade Runner 2049 short film prequel, 2048: Nowhere to Run. In April 2018, Discovery Channel announced that Savage will host and produce a new series called MythBusters Jr., a series focused on a group of young scientists tasked with completing various experiments of challenges through the use of STEAM skills. In July 2018, Savage in a collaboration with Weta Workshop created and acted in the shortfilm A Farewell To Arms. In the same year, he won the Heinz Oberhummer Award for Science Communication. On February 20, 2020, Savage was appointed the Creative Director of SiliCon (formally Silicon Valley Comic Con), succeeding Steve Wozniak.

MythBusters
 

Savage's role with his co-hosts is to disprove or confirm myths through testing and experiments done at different scales. His demeanor on MythBusters is animated and energetic, providing a foil to Jamie Hyneman's more reserved straight-man persona. Savage and Hyneman were the sole hosts of the show for the first season of MythBusters. They introduced members of Hyneman's staff in the second season who began to appear regularly; Kari Byron, Tory Belleci, and welder Scottie Chapman appeared in the second season. In the third season, Chapman was replaced by Grant Imahara, a robot builder and model maker. Filmed in San Francisco and edited in Artarmon, New South Wales, Australia, MythBusters aired 282 total episodes before its cancellation at the end of its 2016 season in March. On November 15, 2017, sister network Science Channel revived the series with the new hosts Jon Lung and Brian Louden, who were selected via the competition spin-off MythBusters: The Search. 

In 2019, Savage hosted the spin-off series Mythbusters Jr., featuring a team of teenagers skilled in STEAM topics.

Other work
In 2019 Savage published his first book, Every Tool's a Hammer: Life Is What You Make It, exploring his approach to making.

Personal life
Savage married Julia Ward on September 11, 2004. He has twin sons from a previous relationship. He wears hearing aids in both ears due to congenital otosclerosis.

In the late 1980s, Savage lived at Eighth Avenue and Carroll Street in Park Slope, Brooklyn. He later moved in with his parents for less than a year, working for a graphic design firm in Manhattan. A close friend who was living on Broderick Street in San Francisco asked him to become his roommate, and Savage moved to San Francisco in August 1990. He continues to live in San Francisco.

Savage has publicly stated that he is an atheist. In a YouTube video dated 14 December 2020, Savage stated that he had married 20 to 25 couples over the course of 25 years, and implied that he was an ordained minister with the Universal Life Church, a group whose only belief is "Do that which is right".

Savage has a lifelong interest in costume making and cosplay: "I remember my mom getting me a Jaws costume when Jaws came out… and wearing a Batman costume. Back then, everyone dressed up as hobos." He strives for authenticity with his costumes. While in high school, he and his father made a suit of armor out of aluminum roof flashing that had seven hundred rivets. "I wore it to school and passed out from heat exhaustion in math class. I woke up in the nurse's office and the first thing I said was 'Where's my armor?'"

In June 2020, Savage's younger sister, Miranda Pacchiana, filed a lawsuit against him, alleging that Savage repeatedly raped her when they were both children. Savage responded, "While I hope that my sister gets the help she needs to find peace, this needs to end. For many years, she has relentlessly and falsely attacked me and other members of my family to anyone who will listen [...] I will fight this groundless and offensive lawsuit and work to put this to rest once and for all." The siblings' mother came to Adam's defense, stating, "It makes me very sad to say this, but my daughter suffers from severe mental health challenges, and it's devastating that she's putting Adam and our entire family through this. Adam is a good man, and I support him completely." The lawsuit was settled through mediation on May 24, 2021, and dismissed on May 25, 2021. Details of the settlement were not made public. Pacchiana removed her original blog post about Savage, which had precipitated the lawsuit.

References

External links 

 
 
 Adam Savage's biography from the Discovery Channel
 

1967 births
Academy of Art University faculty
American artists
American atheists
American male child actors
American skeptics
Television personalities from New York City
Discovery Channel people
Living people
Male actors from New York City
People from Sleepy Hollow, New York
Science communicators
Special effects people
Tisch School of the Arts alumni
Engineers from New York (state)
Industrial Light & Magic people
Shorty Award winners